Michele Carlo Visdomini Cortigiani (1648–1713) was a Roman Catholic prelate who served as Bishop of Pistoia e Prato (1703–1713) and Bishop of San Miniato (1683–1703).

Biography
Michele Carlo Visdomini Cortigiani was born on 4 Nov 1648 in Florence, Italy and ordained a priest in the Archdiocese of Florence in 1677.
On 24 May 1683, he was appointed during the papacy of Pope Innocent XI as Bishop of San Miniato.
On 30 May 1683, he was consecrated bishop by Francesco Nerli (iuniore), Cardinal-Priest of San Matteo in Merulana. 
On 15 Jan 1703, he was transferred by Pope Clement XI to the diocese of Pistoia and Prato.
He served as Bishop of Pistoia e Prato until his death on 14 Oct 1713.

While bishop, he was the principal co-consecrator of Tommaso Vidoni, Titular Archbishop of Edessa in Osrhoëne and Apostolic Nuncio to Florence (1691). On 19 June 1685, Bishop Cortigiani held a diocesan synod; he held another on 3 October 1690; and another on 15 September 1699.

References

Bibliography

External links and additional sources

17th-century Italian Roman Catholic bishops
18th-century Italian Roman Catholic bishops
Bishops appointed by Pope Innocent XI
Bishops appointed by Pope Clement XI
1677 births
1713 deaths